Nikema Natassha Williams (born July 30, 1978) is an American politician and political executive serving as the representative for . The district includes almost three-fourths of Atlanta. She was a member of the Georgia State Senate for the 39th district before her House campaign. She is also the chair of the Democratic Party of Georgia. Williams served as one of 16 electors for Georgia in the Electoral College following the 2020 United States presidential election.

Early life and education
Williams was born in Columbus, Georgia, and raised in Smiths Station, Alabama. Her father was a neighborhood leader, and her great-aunt Autherine Lucy integrated the University of Alabama. Williams graduated from Talladega College, where she became a member of Alpha Kappa Alpha sorority and earned a Bachelor of Arts degree in biology. After graduating from college, she moved to Atlanta in 2002.

Early career
After moving to Atlanta, Williams joined the Young Democrats of Georgia. She then served as vice president for public policy at Planned Parenthood Southeast. In 2011, she was elected the first vice chair of the Democratic Party of Georgia. She served as the party's interim chair in 2013, after Mike Berlon resigned. In 2018, Williams became the State Director of the National Domestic Workers Alliance.

Williams supported Barack Obama's presidential campaigns and served as a member of the Obama Victory Fund in 2012. She was recognized as one of Obama's top bundlers during that campaign cycle, raising over $50,000 for the campaign.

In 2017, Williams was elected to the Georgia State Senate, in a special election after Vincent Fort resigned to run in the Atlanta mayoral election. On November 13, 2018, Williams was one of 15 people arrested during a protest at the Georgia State Capitol against the handling of the 2018 Georgia gubernatorial election. The charges were dropped in June 2019.

In January 2019, Williams was elected to once again lead the Georgia Democratic Party. She became the first Black woman, the third woman, and second African American to chair the party. She was a delegate to the 2008, 2012 and 2016 Democratic National Conventions.

Williams was one of several Georgia General Assembly members to test positive for COVID-19 after being exposed by fellow member Brandon Beach.

U.S. House of Representatives

Elections

2020 elections

On July 20, 2020, after the death of John Lewis, Williams was selected to replace him on the November ballot for Georgia's 5th congressional district in the 2020 election. In the general election, she defeated Republican Angela Stanton-King. The 5th is so heavily Democratic that Williams had been all but assured of a seat in Congress when she was selected to replace Lewis on the ballot. Georgia Governor Brian Kemp called a September 2020 special election to fill the remainder of Lewis's 17th term. Williams opted to not run in the special election, choosing instead to focus on her role as party chair. The special election was won by Atlanta city councilman Kwanza Hall, who served for a month before handing the seat to Williams.

Committee assignments 

 Committee on Financial Services
 Subcommittee on Diversity and Inclusion
 Subcommittee on Oversight and Investigations
 Committee on Transportation and Infrastructure
 Subcommittee on Aviation
 Subcommittee on Highways and Transit
 Select Committee on the Modernization of Congress

Caucus memberships
Congressional Progressive Caucus
New Democrat Coalition

Personal life
Williams's husband, Leslie Small, is a former aide to John Lewis. They met while campaigning for Democrats during the 2008 elections. They have one son. She is a former member of UFCW.

See also 

 List of African-American United States representatives
 Women in the United States House of Representatives

References

External links

Representative Nikema Williams official U.S. House website
 Campaign website
 Biography from the Democratic Party of Georgia

|-

|-

|-

|

1978 births
2020 United States presidential electors
21st-century American women politicians
21st-century American politicians
African-American members of the United States House of Representatives
African-American state legislators in Georgia (U.S. state)
Democratic Party members of the United States House of Representatives from Georgia (U.S. state)
Female members of the United States House of Representatives
Democratic Party Georgia (U.S. state) state senators
Living people
People from Columbus, Georgia
People from Lee County, Alabama
State political party chairs of Georgia (U.S. state)
Talladega College alumni
Women state legislators in Georgia (U.S. state)
21st-century African-American women
21st-century African-American politicians
20th-century African-American people
20th-century African-American women